Bank Negara Komuter station is a KTM Komuter train station in central Kuala Lumpur, named after the Central Bank of Malaysia headquarters located nearby. The halt forms part of a common KTM Komuter railway line shared by both the Port Klang Line and the Seremban Line. It is located at Jalan Dato' Onn.

History
Before the electrification works began, there was a halt located just about 30 metres before the present location. It was a simple shelter with no amenities of any kind - very much like a bus-stop. The diesel engine trains used to pay this route picking up passengers for as low as RM1.00 per trip for a journey of 23 km to Subang Jaya. Tickets then were sold on board. It has since been dismantled and is now just a patch of hill-side.

The present halt was formed during the double tracking and electrification of railway lines in Kuala Lumpur, Selangor and Negeri Sembilan between 1990 and 1994, in preparation for the launch of KTM Komuter services.  Since its opening in 1995, the halt has remained unchanged in both its position in the railway system and layout. Beginning June 2007, however, the halt underwent major reconstruction (see design).

Design

As are other halts along KTM Komuter lines, the Bank Negara halt is lined along two electrified railway tracks, each with one of the halt's two side platforms at either side of the track. However, accommodating railway lines located along a small valley, the halt and its platforms were required to be crammed into a limited amount of space, with one ticketing concourse placed at one edge of the valley. The Bank Negara halt does not feature a centralised ticketing concourse, but was rather designed with two, each intended for either platform. Accordingly the halt does not feature a footbridge in itself, instead relying on a road bridge outside the stop as a crossing over the railway tracks and between two platforms. Owing to its lack of importance managing other responsibilities along the railway other than Komuter services, the halt only houses ticketing facilities for Komuter trains, including ticket counters and ticket vending machines, fare gates, and a small staff.

Fare tickets can be bought with local currency using a combination of coins and notes at the vending machines, which automatically return change at the ticket counters. Currently, there are two ticketing areas - one on each side of the track. There are also dedicated fare gates that are operated with contactless value-stored cards as these are installed with the card readers. Unlike most halts and stations, commuters are not allowed to cross between the two sides, once passed the gates, without going through the fare gates again.

Renovation works to upgrade the halt began in April 2007. The new station will have a new concourse over the tracks and platforms. The new concourse will have a ticketing booth, ticket vending machines, prayer area and retail outlets. It will also have a common entrance to the two platforms where previously, they could only be accessed through separate gates. The new halt will also have lifts for passengers to access the platforms, making the halt disabled-friendly. The weather shelters will be replaced with a single high-cover over the entire waiting areas of both sides and over the tracks. The renovation works, which cost RM6 million, are expected to be completed by mid October 2007. The halt however continues to operate although certain areas have been closed off and the entrances relocated.

Generally, renovations have not been completed as of January 2008. The covered platforms are only about 90% completed. The areas nearer the new main lobby are not fully constructed yet - having only some support frames on both sides. In fact, it is observed that the entire roof of the main lobby has been redesigned. The original design structure (as per picture) was erected but after about 2 months, they were dismantled and in January 2008, a new roof structure was erected.

Interchange

While not well-integrated, the Bank Negara halt is designated in official transit maps as an interchange station with the Ampang and Sri Petaling Lines'  Bandaraya station. Interchanges between the stations require that one exit either stations and cross footbridge that crosses Jalan Kuching and the Gombak River. The estimated walking distance between the stations is 140 m. The Ampang and Sri Petaling Lines station is further situated nearby bus stops along Jalan Raja Laut, Jalan Dang Wangi and Jalan Tuanku Abdul Rahman.

References

External links
Kuala Lumpur MRT & KTM Komuter Integrations

Port Klang Line
Rawang-Seremban Line
Railway stations in Kuala Lumpur
Railway stations opened in 1995
Rapid transit stations in Kuala Lumpur